David W. Hann (born April 16, 1952) is a Minnesota politician and a former minority leader of the Minnesota Senate. A Republican, he represented District 48, which consisted of the cities of Eden Prairie and Minnetonka, from 2003-2017. He is currently the chair of the Republican Party of Minnesota.

Early life, education, and career
Hann was born and raised in Minneapolis, Minnesota. He attended Lincoln High School in Bloomington, Minnesota, then served in the United States Army during the Vietnam War. He attended Gustavus Adolphus College in St. Peter, Minnesota, earning a B.A. in Religion, and took graduate studies in Theology at the University of Chicago.

Hann is a business process consultant. He used to be the Director of Forecasting and Logistics for E.A. Sween Company, also known as Deli Express, in Eden Prairie. He is also a former member of the Eden Prairie School Board, where he also served as clerk and treasurer. He is a member of the board of directors of the Hiawatha Leadership Academy, and is president of Parents for Accountable Schools.

Minnesota Senate
Hann served as an assistant Majority Leader from January through December 2011. He served on the Rules and Administration Committee. He has been chair of the Health and Human Services Committee and also served on the Education and Finance committees. He was an assistant minority leader from 2007 to 2009. His special legislative concerns included education, education reform, taxes, tax relief, business, improved business climate, family law, and agriculture.

Hann has run unsuccessfully to be the Republican leader in the Minnesota Senate multiple times, most recently losing in 2011 to former Majority Leader David Senjem. Following the loss of the Republican majority in the 2012 election, Hann was elected by his caucus to serve as minority leader.

Hann lost re-election to Minnesota Democratic–Farmer–Labor Party (DFL) candidate Steve Cwodzinski in 2016.

2010 Minnesota gubernatorial campaign
On July 16, 2009, Hann announced his candidacy for governor of Minnesota. After statewide polling during and after the 2010 caucuses showed him trailing other contenders, he withdrew from the race on February 16, 2010, opting to focus on re-election to the Minnesota Senate.

References

External links

Minnesota Public Radio Votetracker: Senator David Hann
Project Vote Smart - Senator David Hann Profile

|-

|-

1952 births
21st-century American politicians
Living people
Republican Party Minnesota state senators
People from Minneapolis
People from Eden Prairie, Minnesota